Liopinus centralis is a species of beetle in the family Cerambycidae. It was described by John Lawrence LeConte in 1884.

References

Acanthocinini
Beetles described in 1884